

Bruno Gerloch (11 November 1890 – 3 September 1954) was an Austrian general in the Wehrmacht of Nazi Germany during World War II.  He was a recipient of the Knight's Cross of the Iron Cross.

Awards and decorations

 Knight's Cross of the Iron Cross on 4 September 1940 as Oberst and commander of Artillerie-Regiment 90

Notes

References

 

1890 births
1954 deaths
People from Cieszyn
Major generals of the German Army (Wehrmacht)
Austro-Hungarian military personnel of World War I
Austrian military personnel of World War II
Recipients of the Gold German Cross
Recipients of the Knight's Cross of the Iron Cross
Austrian prisoners of war
People from Austrian Silesia